Park Ji-yeon (known mononymously as Jiyeon), is a South Korean singer, actress and model. She is a member of girl group T-ara and its subgroup T-ara N4.

Park has starred in multiple Korean and international movies and television series since 2007. Her first movie offer was the second installment of "Gas Station Raid", however, due to scheduling conflicts, Jiyeon had to drop the offer shortly after she was confirmed as lead.

Film

Television series

Web series

Theatre / musical

Television shows

Music videos appearances

Hosting

References 

Actress filmographies
South Korean filmographies